Lanee "Carrie" Butler-Beashel (born June 3, 1970 in Manhasset, New York) is an American windsurfer. She competed at four Olympics from 1992 to 2004. Her best position was fourth in 2000.

She is married to America's Cup sailor Adam Beashel. Her brother in law is six-time Olympian Colin Beashel. She and Adam have two sons, born in 2005 and 2008.

References

External links
 
 
 
 

1970 births
Living people
American windsurfers
Female windsurfers
American female sailors (sport)
Olympic sailors of the United States
Sailors at the 1992 Summer Olympics – Lechner A-390
Sailors at the 1996 Summer Olympics – Mistral One Design
Sailors at the 2000 Summer Olympics – Mistral One Design
Sailors at the 2004 Summer Olympics – Mistral One Design
Pan American Games gold medalists for the United States
Pan American Games bronze medalists for the United States
Pan American Games medalists in sailing
Sailors at the 1991 Pan American Games
Sailors at the 1995 Pan American Games
Sailors at the 1999 Pan American Games
Sailors at the 2003 Pan American Games
Medalists at the 1991 Pan American Games
Medalists at the 1995 Pan American Games
Medalists at the 1999 Pan American Games
Medalists at the 2003 Pan American Games
21st-century American women
People from Manhasset, New York